Jesús Beltre (born 26 December 1964) is a Dominican Republic boxer. He competed at the 1984 Summer Olympics and the 1988 Summer Olympics.

References

External links
 

1964 births
Living people
Dominican Republic male boxers
Olympic boxers of the Dominican Republic
Boxers at the 1984 Summer Olympics
Boxers at the 1988 Summer Olympics
People from La Romana, Dominican Republic
Light-flyweight boxers
Pan American Games medalists in boxing
Medalists at the 1987 Pan American Games
Pan American Games bronze medalists for the Dominican Republic
Boxers at the 1987 Pan American Games
20th-century Dominican Republic people
21st-century Dominican Republic people